In This Corner may refer to:

 In This Corner (1948 film), an American sports drama film directed by Charles Reisner
 In This Corner (1986 film), a Canadian TV film directed by Atom Egoyan